Oenomaus morroensis is a species of butterfly of the family Lycaenidae. It is found in lower montane and subtropical forests in Brazil.

References

Butterflies described in 2008
Eumaeini